The 1965–66 Greek Football Cup was the 24th edition of the Greek Football Cup. 

Foe the second time in three editions, the Cup Final was scratched: AEK Athens were awarded the Cup as the HFF was late to determine a date for the match. Due to Olympiacos having to prepare for the next season's European Cup, the delay meant that Olympiacos would not be able to field a team for the Final.

Calendar
From Round of 32 onwards:

Knockout phase
In the knockout phase, teams play against each other over a single match. If the match ends up as a draw, extra time will be played. If a winner doesn't occur after the extra time the winner emerges by a flip of a coin.The mechanism of the draws for each round is as follows:
In the draw for the round of 32, the teams that had qualified to previous' season Round of 16 are seeded and the clubs that passed the qualification round are unseeded.
In the draws for the round of 16 onwards, there are no seedings, and teams from the same group can be drawn against each other.

Bracket

Round of 32

|}

*Coin toss.

Round of 16

|}

*Coin toss.

Quarter-finals

|}

Semi-finals

|}

* Kavala did not show up, claiming that the match should be played in their home ground. According to relative regulation, the HFF, even though they set the match at Kaftanzoglio Stadium in Thessaloniki, did not accept Kavala's claim and awarded the match to AEK Athens 2–0.

Final
The Final was scratched and AEK Athens were awarded the Cup as Olympiacos were unable to participate due to their preparation for the next season's European Cup, following the HFF being late to determine a date for the match.

References

External links
Greek Cup 1965-66 at RSSSF

Greek Football Cup seasons
Greek Cup
Cup